Franklin Rio also known as "Frank Rio" and "Frank Cline" (June 30, 1895 – February 23, 1935) was a member of Al Capone's Chicago-based criminal organization known as the Chicago Outfit. He was also an alleged gunman in the famous 1929 St. Valentine's Day Massacre.

Early life
According to his birth certificate, Frank Rio was born July 2, 1895 in Oliveto Citra, Italy, to Antonio and Rosa (Costa) Rio.

Rio married the former Anna Chapele in the mid-1910s. The couple had one son, Lawrence, born 1922.

Organized crime involvement
Rio's involvement in crime began early in life, and included robbery, burglary, and auto theft. In 1918, he was arrested several times in connection with several different hold-ups. In September 1918, he was arrested for robbing a bank in Maywood, but never convicted. On November 10, 1919, Rio was arrested after police caught him loading stolen furs into a stolen vehicle. On January 17, 1921, Rio—along with Robert O'Neill and Thomas Dyer—robbed a mail train at Chicago's Union Station, stealing bonds worth $482,000. Although indicted for the daring daylight robbery, Rio was never brought to trial and the charges dropped. Rio's ability to escape punishment could not be attributed to good luck or innocence but rather to the bribing of judges and the intimidation and murder of witnesses. In time, criminal elements dubbed him "Slippery" Frank Rio for his knack of evading trial.

Capone gang
Rio's criminal exploits brought him to the attention of Al Capone, leader of the Chicago Outfit. Capone quickly came to trust Rio's judgment, and Rio became intensely loyal to Capone. Rio eventually became one of Capone's personal bodyguards and took care of some of Capone's personal needs and business. Capone himself is rumored to have said that Jack McGurn and Rio were his "golden boys".

Rio became one of Capone's most recognizable and loyal hitmen. He allegedly once threw Capone to the ground during a hit by Earl "Hymie" Weiss. Rio also is said to have foiled a plot by Albert Anselmi, John Scalise and Joseph Guinta to depose Capone and take over the Chicago Outfit. Underworld figures later claimed that Rio was one of the trio's executioners.

In 1929, Rio was suspected as possibly one of the hitmen who murdered five rival gang members, a gang "hanger on" and the gangs occasional auto mechanic in the St. Valentine's Day Massacre. Posing as police officers, four men entered a warehouse at 2122 N. Clark Street used by George "Bugs" Moran and his gang. The men lined their seven victims against a wall as if to frisk and handcuff them. They then pulled Thompson submachine guns from their overcoats and murdered the men.  Two of the men also suffered shotgun blasts to the head. Rio has always been a strong suspect as one of the shooters, but notwithstanding good circumstantial claims for more than a dozen different men (there were only four shooters), it is still not known for certain who any of the four shooters were.

Rio also attended the 1929 Atlantic City Conference with Capone. Capone arranged to have himself jailed in Philadelphia after the conference in order to avoid the numerous "murder-for-hire" rackets that were hunting him. Rio served time alongside Capone to protect him and see to his needs.

Rio was allegedly one of the few members of Capone's gang who understood the seriousness of the tax evasion charges made against Capone by the federal government in 1931. However, he was unable to convince Capone of this, and Capone was convicted and imprisoned.

After Capone was sent to federal prison, Rio was considered as his successor. But Rio was opposed by many high-level mobsters in the Capone organization. Many thought he had too little leadership experience. Several gangsters also accused Rio of having "gone soft" due to his years of "high living" he had enjoyed alongside Capone. Rio was eventually passed over in favor of another Capone hitman and lieutenant, Frank Nitti.

Post-Capone activities
Although Rio never left the Capone mob, his association with it dwindled over the next several years. In 1932, the Chicago Outfit sent Rio to New Jersey to offer the mob's assistance in helping Charles Lindbergh find his kidnapped baby son. His assistance was refused.
Rio's health also began to deteriorate. He suffered from heart disease, which caused severe shortness of breath and physical weakness. Beginning in 1933, he rarely left his Oak Park home. However, he maintained financial interests in a number of cafes, nightclubs and casinos.

Death

Frank Rio died at noon on February 23, 1935. The cause of death was a coronary occlusion, causing a heart attack.

Associates in the Chicago Outfit took charge of his remains and had him buried. Police later said that gang members became involved in his burial because they wanted to divide up Rio's gang-owned assets before news of his death hit the streets.

Although Rio was a Roman Catholic, the Church denied him a church funeral. A priest said prayers over his body at a local undertakers instead. As befitting a high-level mobster, his funeral was an exceedingly large one. Several hundred automobiles bearing mourners comprised the funeral cortege. He was interred in Mount Carmel Cemetery in Hillside, Illinois.

Rio's widow, Anna, got re-married on November 29, 1935 to Charles Taskoski. She died shortly after the marriage in an automobile accident on December 26, 1935. She left behind a large amount of jewelry and cash. According to family members, mobsters later intimidated the family into turning the valuables and cash over to the Chicago Outfit.

In popular culture
Frank Rio was portrayed by Ron Smith in the 2017 film Gangster Land

Notes

References
"Capone Allies See His Finish and Dispute for Gang Throne." Chicago Daily Tribune. June 15, 1931.
"Capone Takes Cover In Jail." Chicago Daily Tribune. May 18, 1929.
Eghigian, Mars. After Capone: The Life and World of Chicago Mob Boss Frank 'the Enforcer' Nitti. Nashville, Tenn.: Cumberland House, 2006.
Evans, Arthur. "Continuances Aid Criminals to Flout Justice." Chicago Daily Tribune. February 14, 1922.
"Frank Rio, Once Bodyguard for Al Capone, Dies." Chicago Daily Tribune. February 24, 1935.
Johnson, Curt and Sautter, R. Craig. The Wicked City: Chicago from Kenna to Capone. Paperback ed. Chicago: Da Capo Press, 1998. 
Kobler, John. Capone: The Life and Times of Al Capone. New York: Da Capo Press, 2003. 
Nash, Jay Robert. World Encyclopedia of Organized Crime. Chicago: Da Capo Press, 1993. 
Russo, Gus. The Outfit. New York: Bloomsbury USA, 2003. 

1895 births
1935 deaths
Al Capone associates
American gangsters of Italian descent
Chicago Outfit mobsters
Prohibition-era gangsters
Burials at the Bishop's Mausoleum, Mount Carmel Cemetery (Hillside)
Italian emigrants to the United States